Youssef Al-Dosari (born 12 January 1962) is a Saudi Arabian hurdler. He competed in the men's 110 metres hurdles at the 1988 Summer Olympics.

References

1962 births
Living people
Athletes (track and field) at the 1988 Summer Olympics
Saudi Arabian male hurdlers
Olympic athletes of Saudi Arabia
Place of birth missing (living people)